Zako Heskija, Isaac Solomonov Heskiya, Зако Хеския, also: Zako Heskia or "Sako Cheskija" (21 September 1922 – 3 June 2006) was a Bulgarian film director and screenwriter. He was born in Istanbul (Turkey) to Jewish parents.

He graduated Cinema and Photograph College in Sofia. Since 1956 until 1965, he had been an assistant director in Boyana Film Studio. Heskia became in 1966 international audience for "Gorechto Pladne" (Torrid Noon), the first Bulgarian contribution to the Cannes Film Festival and a nomination for the Palme d'Or. In 1981 he won the spezial prize at the 12th Moscow International Film Festival for Yo Ho Ho.

Zako Heskiya worked as a leader of the group "Debut" in former Boyana Studio (succeeded by Nu Boyana Film Studios) and opened the door to professional work for many young Bulgarian film directors.

Filmography 
Films
 1966 Goreshto pladne (Torrid Noon) (Director)
 1966 The Start of the Summer Holidays (Director)
 1969 The Eighth (Director)
 1971 Three Reservists (Director)
 1974 Dawn Over the Drava (Director)
 1976 Bou Posledon (Director/ Screenplay)
 1979 A Final Battle (Director)
 1981 Yo Ho Ho (Director)
 1989 Scar-Free (Director)

TV films
 1979 Alone Among Wolves (Director)
 1985 Nights with the White Horses (Director)

References

External links
 

1922 births
2006 deaths
Bulgarian film directors
People from Sofia
Bulgarians in Istanbul
Turkish people of Jewish descent
Bulgarian people of Jewish descent